Duncan Lake is a lake in western Quebec Canada.

References 

Lakes of Nord-du-Québec